This is a list of films produced in Hong Kong in 1977.

#

A-B

C-D

E-F

G-H

I-J

K-Z

References

External links
 IMDB list of Hong Kong films
 Hong Kong films of 1977 at HKcinemamagic.com

1977
Lists of 1977 films by country or language
Films